The 2022 Senior Open Championship, for sponsorship reasons known as The Senior Open Championship presented by Rolex was a senior major golf championship and the 35th Senior Open Championship, held on 21–24 July at Gleneagles – Kings Course in Auchterarder, Perthshire, Scotland. It was the first Senior Open Championship played at the course and the 19th Senior Open Championship played as a senior major championship.

Venue
The Gleneagles Hotel opened in 1924 and is located one hour outside of Edinburgh and set in grounds of 850 acres (340 ha; 1.33 sq mi). Gleneagles has three golf courses: the King's Course, Queen's Course and PGA Centenary Course, previously known as the Monarch's Course. There is also a nine-hole course called the PGA National Academy Course. The championship course, the Kings Course, was originally designed by James Braid and opened in 1919.

Course layout

Field
The field consisted of 144 competitors, 135 professionals and nine amateurs.

Four qualifying events took place on Monday July 18, for players who were not already exempt, at three venues in Scotland; Ladybank Golf Club, Fife, and Glenbervie Golf Club, Falkirk, each hosting a qualifying event while Blairgowrie Golf Club in Perth hosted an event on each of its two courses; the Rosemount and the Lansdowne.

51 players, including former PGA Tour winners Carlos Franco, David Frost and Len Mattiace, advanced from the qualifying competitions and joined the 93 exempt players for the championship. 

71 players, 69 professionals and two amateurs, made the 36 hole cut.

Past winners of The Senior Open Championship in the field
The field included four former winners of The Senior Open Championship, 2016 champion Paul Broadhurst (tied 3rd), 2010, 2014, 2017 and 2019 champion Bernhard Langer (tied 12th), 2018 champion Miguel Ángel Jiménez (tied 29th) and 2021 champion Stephen Dodd (tied 47th).

Past winners and runners-up at The Open Championship in the field
The field included six former winners of The Open Championship. Four of them made the 36 hole cut; 1999 Open champion Paul Lawrie (tied 10th), 2002 and 2012 Open champion Ernie Els (tied 3rd), 2007 and 2008 Open champion Pádraig Harrington (2nd) and  2011 Open champion Darren Clarke (won). 1985 Open champion Sandy Lyle and 2001 Open champion David Duval did not make the cut.

The field also included six former runners-up in The Open Championship. Four of them made the cut; Colin Montgomerie (9th), Stuart Appleby (19th), Thomas Bjørn (tied 34th) and Thomas Levet (69th). Vijay Singh and Niclas Fasth missed the cut.

Final results
Sunday, 24 July 2022

53-year-old Darren Clarke birdied the par-5 final hole to win by a stroke and became the fourth man to win both The Open Championship and The Senior Open Championship, joining Gary Player, Bob Charles and Tom Watson. When the last group of Clarke and Paul Broadhurst had five holes to go at 6 p.m. local time, play was suspended due to heavy rain and resumed at 8 p.m.

Source:

Notes and references

External links 
 Event info on European Senior Tour website
 Event info on PGA Tour website

Senior major golf championships
Golf tournaments in Scotland
Senior Open Championship
Senior Open Championship
Senior Open Championship